William D. Ward was an American politician.

From St. Lucie County, Florida (1844-1855), Ward served in the Florida House of Representatives in 1846.

Notes

Year of birth unknown
Year of death unknown
People from St. Lucie County, Florida
Members of the Florida House of Representatives